Najeba Latef Ahmed (born 1 July 1969) is an Iraqi Kurdish politician of the Kurdistan Islamic Group. She was born in Sulaymaniyah.

References

1969 births
Living people
Iraqi Kurdistani politicians
Members of the Kurdistan Region Parliament
People from Sulaymaniyah
21st-century Iraqi politicians